Zhang Shuai was the defending champion of 2013, as this tournament was not held in 2014, however she lost in the second round to Tian Ran.

Hsieh Su-wei won the title, defeating Yulia Putintseva in the final, 7–6(7–5), 2–6, 6–2.

Seeds

Draw

Finals

Top half

Bottom half

References
Main Draw

Nanjing Singles
2015 Singles